This is a list of states and territories of India by installed power generation capacity. This is measured in Megawatts (MW) which is equal to one million watts of electric power. As of 31 July 2022, the installed capacity is 404,132.95 MW. Gujarat (43.6 GW) leads in power generation capacity, followed by Maharashtra (42.3 GW) and Tamil Nadu (36.3 GW), though Karnataka leads in renewable energy capacity.

List 

Other Renewable Energy sources include SHP (Small Hydro Power - hydel plants ≤ 25 MW), Biomass Power, Urban & Industrial waste, Solar and Wind Energy

See also

 List of power stations in India
 Energy policy of India
 Electricity in India
 Solar power in India
 Wind power in India
 Nuclear power in India

References 

Electric power in India
India, installed power capacity
Lists of subdivisions of India
Energy in India by state or union territory
Economy of India lists